"Eminence Front" is a song by the Who, written and sung by lead guitarist Pete Townshend. It appears as the sixth track on the group's 1982 studio album, It's Hard. The single reached number 68 on the Billboard Hot 100.

Background and recording
In the song, Townshend sings about the delusions and drug use of the wealthy and hedonistic. The lyrics describe a party in which people hide from their problems behind a façade. Townshend has introduced the song in live performances with: "This song is about what happens when you take too much white powder; it's called 'Eminence Front. In an interview, Townshend explained:

In the originally released version, there is a timing flaw or a syncopation in the first chorus, where Townshend sings "behind an eminence front" at the same time Daltrey sings "it's an eminence front", with Townshend one syllable behind.  A more linear-sounding remixed version appears on the 1997 re-release of It's Hard (a live version, recorded on the band's final stop on their 1982 tour in Toronto, appears as a bonus track on the re-release). Additionally, the remix has Townshend's vocals panned centrally rather than hard right in the stereo field. The lyrics are often misunderstood by the listener.

Release
"Eminence Front" was scheduled to be released as a single in the UK by Polydor Records in 1982; the catalog number was WHO 7 but the single was never released. The picture sleeve, by Richard Evans, depicted a 1930s Art Deco house in Miami. The single in its picture sleeve was finally released in 2017 as part of The Who's The Polydor Singles 1975-2015 box set.

Critical reception
In a wholly negative review of It's Hard, Robert Christgau gave faint praise to "Eminence Front" as the album's high point, sarcastically noting how the aging Townshend "discovers funk. Just in time. Bye."  Cash Box said that it "rides along on Pete Townshend’s cleanly slicing guitar and the band’s patented synth sound" as well as a "strong bottom" from the drums and bass guitar." Rolling Stone ranked the song as the Who's tenth best song, stating, Eminence Front' showed they could connect Townshend's new wave-influenced solo work with the classic sound of Who's Next."

In popular culture

The song has been used as the intro music for Dallas Mavericks games since it was adopted during the 2000–01 NBA season, the team's final season at the Reunion Arena. The song was chosen by Mavericks marketing executive Matt Fitzgerald, who stated that he was looking for a song with an instrumental introduction which builds to a crescendo in the same manner as the Alan Parsons Project's "Sirius", which is used in the same way by the Chicago Bulls: "We tried many different songs during our last season in Reunion Arena... Then one day in my car, I was listening to a Who CD and 'Eminence Front' came on. We tried it, the Mavs fans responded in a very positive way, so it became our signature player introduction song". In a 2019 interview, Townshend said that its adoption by the Mavericks was "a wonderful use of the song... I must have known [the team used it], because I must have given permission, but I had forgotten".

Charts

Weekly charts

References

External links
Eminence Front lyrics

The Who songs
Songs written by Pete Townshend
1982 singles
Song recordings produced by Glyn Johns
Warner Records singles
Polydor Records singles
1982 songs
Dallas Mavericks